A ministry of social security or department of social security is a government entity responsible for social security affairs.  It may be a ministry office, a department, or, as in the United States, a nominally independent agency.

Notable ones are:
 Ministry of Labor and Social Security (Argentina)
Department of Social Security (Australia) (defunct)
 Ministry of Social Security (Brazil)
 Ministry of Human Resources and Social Security (China)
 Ministry of Social Protection (Colombia)
 Ministry of Social Solidarity and Inclusion (East Timor)
 Federal Ministry for Health and Social Security (Germany)
 Ministry of Labor, Social Security, and Welfare (Greece)
 Ministry of Welfare (Iceland)
 Ministry of Labour and Employment (India)
 Ministry of Welfare and Social Security (Iran)
 Ministry of Labor and Social Security (Jamaica)
 Ministry of Social Security and Labor (Lithuania)
 Ministry of Social Affairs and Employment (Netherlands)
 Social Security System (Philippines)
 Ministry of Inclusion, Social Security and Migration (Spain)
 Ministry of Health and Social Affairs (Sweden)
 Ministry of Labor and Social Security (Turkey)
 Department for Work and Pensions (UK)
Department of Social Security, UK (defunct)
Social Security Administration (United States)

See also
 Ministry of Employment (disambiguation)
 Ministry of Health
 Ministry of Labor
 Ministry of Welfare (disambiguation)
 Social security
 Social Security Administration

 

Former disambiguation pages converted to set index articles